Pahnai (also Romanized as Pahnā’ī; also known as Pānāi and Pānāy) is a village in Qaen Rural District, in the Central District of Qaen County, South Khorasan Province, Iran. At the 2006 census, its population was 1,776, in 465 families.

References 

Populated places in Qaen County